Gregory Mark Pascoe Searle  (born 20 March 1972) is a British Olympic rower educated at Hampton School and London South Bank University.

Career
Greg Searle is an Olympic gold medalist, winning the coxed pairs event at the 1992 Barcelona Olympics with his brother Jonny Searle and cox Garry Herbert. He also won a World Championships gold medal in 1993 with his brother. In the 1996 Atlanta Olympics, he finished third in the coxless four event. Following Atlanta, he converted briefly to competing in the single scull (coached by Harry Mahon) where he won bronze at the 1997 World Rowing Championships and in the same year the single sculls' event at Henley Royal Regatta. He was a finalist in the men's pair at the 2000 Sydney Olympics with Ed Coode, finishing a disappointing and close fourth, having led much of the way.

After his retirement as an international rower, Searle joined the British sailing team in the America's Cup. He was a "grinder" in the 2002 Challenger Series.

He returned to international rowing at the age of 38 for the 2010 World Rowing Championships and was part of the British squad that topped the medal table at the 2011 World Rowing Championships in Bled, where he won a silver medal as part of the eight with Nathaniel Reilly-O'Donnell, Cameron Nichol, James Foad, Alex Partridge, Moe Sbihi, Tom Ransley, Daniel Ritchie and Phelan Hill.

He won an Olympic bronze medal, age 40, in the men's eight at London 2012.

Searle was awarded an MBE in the 1993 New Year's Honours, following his gold at Barcelona.

He is a steward of Henley Royal Regatta. Married to Jenny, he has two children, Josie and Adam. Cricketer, Laurie Evans is his nephew.

References

External links 
 
 British Olympic Committee
 
 Rower Searle trains for 2012 comeback
 Coxless pair pipped on line, The Times, 22 September 2000
 GBR crew profiles — Greg Searle from the BBC
 Greg Searle MBE — Account Director
 Heroes' Heroes: Greg Searle, Olympic gold medal-winning rower, on Mickey Skinner, The Sunday Times, 7 August 2005

1972 births
Living people
People educated at Hampton School
English male rowers
English Olympic medallists
Olympic rowers of Great Britain
Olympic gold medallists for Great Britain
Olympic bronze medallists for Great Britain
Rowers at the 1992 Summer Olympics
Rowers at the 1996 Summer Olympics
Rowers at the 2000 Summer Olympics
Rowers at the 2012 Summer Olympics
Members of the Order of the British Empire
Stewards of Henley Royal Regatta
Olympic medalists in rowing
Medalists at the 2012 Summer Olympics
Alumni of London South Bank University
Sportspeople from Surrey
World Rowing Championships medalists for Great Britain
Medalists at the 1996 Summer Olympics
Medalists at the 1992 Summer Olympics